Nezpercella is a genus of trematodes in the family Opecoelidae. It consists of a single species, Nezpercella lewisi.

References

Opecoelidae
Trematode genera
Monotypic protostome genera